Delta 4 was a British software developer created by Fergus McNeill, writing and publishing interactive fiction.

Delta 4 designed games between 1984 and 1992. Some were self-published, others were released by CRL Group, Piranha Software, Silversoft, or On-Line Entertainment. Delta 4 were also credited with providing the code for Jonathan Nash's tape magazine YS2 which was given away free with Your Sinclair magazine and published by Future Publishing.

History 
Delta 4 was formed by McNeill with a few friends whilst still at school. Their debut text adventure games were the Dragonstar trilogy ("...like Classic Adventure but without the interesting bits.") and two Holy Joystick comedy adventures, self-published in 1984. Gilsoft's The Quill was the design software.

Their first critical success was Bored of the Rings, inspired by the Harvard Lampoon novel of the same name. Published in 1985, it received a Sinclair User Classic award. They also published Robin of Sherlock.

In the early 1990s, Delta 4 developed several CD-based games. The Town with No Name, Psycho Killer and The Hound of the Baskervilles were all developed using D.U.N.E. (Developers Universal Non-programming Environment) and all games were panned by both critics and players.

Games developed 
Sherwood Forest (Delta 4, 1984)
The Dragonstar Trilogy (Delta 4, 1984)
Quest for the Holy Joystick (Delta 4, 1984)
Return of the Holy Joystick (Delta 4, 1984)
Bored of the Rings (Delta 4/CRL Group, 1985)
Robin of Sherlock (Silversoft, 1985)
Galaxias (Delta 4, 1986)
The Colour of Magic (Piranha Software, 1986)
The Boggit (CRL Group, 1986)
The Big Sleaze (Piranha Software, 1987)
Murder Off Miami (CRL Group, 1987)
The Town with No Name (Delta 4/On-Line, 1992)
Psycho Killer (Delta 4/On-Line, 1992)

The Town with No Name 

The Town with No Name (sometimes published as Town with No Name) is a Western action-adventure point-and-click game released by On-Line Entertainment in 1992 for the Commodore CDTV. A version for MS-DOS was released in 1993.

The game stars "The Man with No Name" (a reference to the film character of the same name portrayed by Clint Eastwood), who gets off a train at the station in the eponymous town. Upon entering the town, he is quickly confronted by a gunman. Once No Name kills the gunman, an unnamed man with a cigarette who more closely resembles Eastwood's character reveals that the gunman was the youngest brother of Evil Eb, the leader of the Hole-in-the-Head Gang, and hints that Eb will send his bandits after No Name. No Name then explores each of the town's buildings, either by interacting with the town's residents or by playing minigames, and duels with gang members usually after leaving the buildings.

After killing every outlaw except Evil Eb, No Name confronts Eb himself but only shoots off his hat. Eb, having dropped his gun in surprise and resigning to his defeat, asks No Name to kill him, believing him to be a man called Billy-Bob. No Name explains that he is not Billy-Bob and came to town to meet his sister, believing he is in a town called Dodge Gulch. Eb tells him in turn that Dodge Gulch is actually "20 miles down the line" from where they are. No Name spares Eb because of their misunderstanding each other, and the two become friends in the end over whiskey.

To trigger an alternate ending to the game, No Name can leave on the train that brought him into town at any point prior to his encounter with the bandit "Wildcard" Willy McVee in the saloon. As the train departs, a small boy yells, "Come back, Shane!", prompting No Name to shoot the child and tell him that his name is not Shane before the train flies away into outer space.

The gameplay is divided into two forms: 1) a point-and-click format with menus containing multiple options, followed by short animated scenes based on the player's selections; 2) a first-person shooter-type interface where the player must quickly shoot a target before the target shoots back, ending the game in defeat.

The Town with No Name was conceived by Fergus McNeill who came up with idea when he saw a friend wearing a pair of cowboy boots. "My mind was turned towards the whole genre of Spaghetti Western," he explained. "It was begging for me to do something with it."

The game has received a mostly negative critical reception, including a D+ from Amiga Game Zone, a 35% from Amiga Format, and a 3 out of 10 stars from PC Review. Dave Winder of Amiga Computing was more positive, stating that the game is "let down by its lack of real lasting gameplay, but the interactive elements and the fact that there is so much humour and so many hidden sequences lift it above being just another game."

Psycho Killer  

Psycho Killer is a graphic action-adventure game released by On-Line Entertainment in 1992 for the Commodore CDTV. A version for MS-DOS was released in 1993.

The game involves an unnamed protagonist going on a quest in order to save a woman from a murderer, and to save himself. The graphics for the game were created using digitised still photographs that were taken in the suburbs of London.

Gameplay of Psycho Killer is restricted to a point-and-click interface, such as clicking certain arrows to go their respective direction. There are multiple times in the game where the player must respond promptly to a quick time event in order to proceed to the next scene. Failure to do so can result in the game ending with the protagonist's death.

In issue 32 of Amiga Format, the reviewer gave the game 13% and complained of "poor gameplay", comparing it to an "interactive home movie" and asked who would want to play a game featuring a "spotty herbert who drives a Vauxhall Chevette". The game was reviewed again in issue 39 of the same magazine; the review gave it the same score, and complained again about the poor gameplay.

Amiga Joker reviewed the game more positively. The magazine gave the game a 3/5, stating, "with a little bit of goodwill, the game could be described as a interactive movie". The magazine ended the review calling the game "the best pure CD game ever."

Amiga Magazine also reviewed the game positively, but did not give a score. The magazine spoke about the "forgiving reaction time". The magazine also said that the game is well-tuned to the CDTV. The magazine complained that the mouse pointer was black which made it "impossible to see" during some scenes.

References

External links 
 Official Delta 4 website 
 

Defunct video game companies of the United Kingdom
Video game companies established in 1984
1984 establishments in England